Martin Kotůlek (born 11 September 1969) is a Czech football manager and former player. He is the current caretaker-manager of Sigma Olomouc.

At club level, Kotůlek made over 400 appearances in the top leagues of Czechoslovakia and later the Czech Republic, playing for most of his career with home town club Sigma Olomouc. He was part of the silver medal winning squad of the Czech Republic at UEFA Euro 1996; in his career he made one appearance for Czechoslovakia and seven for the Czech Republic after its independence.

Playing career
Kotůlek was born in Olomouc. He played seven matches for the Czech Republic and was a participant at the 1996 UEFA European Championship.

Kotůlek played his 400th league game in the Czech (including previously Czechoslovak) top flight in 2004 for SFC Opava, but his team lost against Zlín. His team went on to be relegated in last place in the 2004–05 Gambrinus liga and his career in the top division was over, having amassed 412 appearances and 12 goals.

Managerial career
During his last season as a player, Kotůlek worked as an assistant coach at 1. HFK Olomouc in the 2007–08 Czech 2. Liga. He then headed to Sigma Olomouc in 2008 as an assistant coach under newly appointed manager Zdeněk Psotka.

He served as assistant manager at Olomouc under three managers, following Psotka, also Petr Uličný and then Roman Pivarník. Following Pivarník's sacking in May 2013, Kotůlek was appointed as caretaker manager at the club until the end of the season, his first such appointment.

References

External links
 
 
 

Living people
1969 births
Association football defenders
Czech footballers
Czech football managers
UEFA Euro 1996 players
Czechoslovakia international footballers
Czechoslovak footballers
Czech Republic international footballers
Dual internationalists (football)
Czech First League players
Sportspeople from Olomouc
SK Sigma Olomouc players
FC Zbrojovka Brno players
SFC Opava players
1. HFK Olomouc players
Czech First League managers
SK Sigma Olomouc managers